Stadtmitte may refer to: 

Stadtmitte (Berlin U-Bahn)
Stuttgart Stadtmitte station, an S-Bahn Station in Stuttgart, Germany
SG Stadtmitte Berlin, a former German football club

See also
Düsseldorf-Stadtmitte
Koblenz-Stadtmitte station
Mitte